Cumberland, Ontario may refer to:

Cumberland, Ontario, a former township that has been amalgamated into the city of Ottawa, Canada
Cumberland, Ottawa, a village located within the former township of Cumberland
Cumberland Beach, a community located in Severn, Ontario

See also
Cumberland (disambiguation)